= Catherine Hale =

Catherine Hale (1868–1947) was an American advocate for the blind from Chicago, Missouri. She founded the Kansas City Association for the Blind, now known as Alphapointe Association for the Blind. She also started the Catherine Hale Home for blind women in 1919.

== Early life ==
Catherine Hale was born in Chicago in 1868, descended from Nebraska pioneers. She and her husband, James H. Hale, moved to Kansas City about 1890. Catherine would attend The Workers for the Blind of Greater Kansas City with her blind brother, and learned that opportunities for the blind in Kansas City were sparse.
